The United Transitional Cabinet is an alternative government for Belarus that was formed in August 2022.

Creation
Following disputed 2020 Belarusian presidential election, opposition forces, led by presidential candidate Sviatlana Tsikhanouskaya formed a Coordination Council to facilitate a transition to democracy in the country. Tsikhanouskaya and several other members of the council were forced to leave Belarus or were placed under arrest during protests that broke out following the election.

The United Transitional Cabinet was formed on 9 August 2022 during a two-day conference in Vilnius after members of the Belarusian opposition requested Tsikhanouskaya to form "a united interim government".

Aims and guidelines
The stated aims of the United Transitional Cabinet are as follows:

"Defend the independence and sovereignty of the Republic of Belarus, represent the national interests of Belarus."
"Carry out the de facto de-occupation of Belarus."
"Restore constitutional legality and the rule of law."
"Develop and implement measures to thwart the illegal retention of power, ensure the transit of power from dictatorship to democracy, and create conditions for fair and free elections."
"Develop and implement the solutions needed to secure a democratic change in Belarus."

Activities
In August 2022, activities of the Cabinet included the preparation of legal documents to define structures, responsibilities, decision-making methods, and selection of staff.

Reaction

The European Parliament passed a resolution welcoming the formation of the United Transitional Cabinet on 24 November 2022.

The European Union did not recognise Lukashenko’s claimed victory in the 2020 presidential election in Belarus stating that 
"These elections were neither free nor fair. The European Union considers their results falsified and therefore does not recognise the election results announced by the Central Election Commission of Belarus.

Some leaders of the democratic movement in Belarus, including former presidential candidates, have not recognised the United Transitional Cabinet. Their main arguments are that no one elected the cabinet members, and therefore in their opinion the UTC does not represent the people. 
One former presidential candidate of 2010 Andrei Sannikov called the members of the cabinet “impostors”.
Another former presidential candidate for 2020 Valery Tsepkalo stated that both Tihanovskaya's office, the Cabinet and the Coordination Council are "fake structures", "appointed by one person", because the Belarusian people did not participate in choosing the members of these structures and did not authorise them to develop programs. They claim that many members of the cabinet are unknown in Belarus.

Members
Membership of the Cabinet is for a term of six months. The members of the transitional cabinet are as follows:

See also
Belarusian democracy movement
Coordination Council (Belarus)
Rada of the Belarusian Democratic Republic
Belarusian partisan movement (2020–present)

References

External links
United Transitional Cabinet
United Transitional Cabinet on Telegram
New Belarus Conference
People's Embassies of Belarus

2020–2021 Belarusian protests
Belarusian opposition
Politics of Belarus
2022 in Belarus
Democratization
Exile organizations
Governments in exile